karate, is an eclectic martial arts system developed by Robert Trias (1923–1989), reportedly the first Hispanic to teach a form of karate in the mainland United States, who opened his public first dojo in 1946 in Phoenix, Arizona.

History 
Shuri-ryū is a style that has a lineage coming from a variety of sources, including karate. Other influences include Xing Yi Quan (Hsing-Yi) Kung Fu.

Trias was first introduced to karate while in the Navy during World War II, when he was stationed in the Solomon Islands. In 1944 Robert Trias met Tung Gee Hsing and began training with him. Hsing practiced the Chinese system of Xingyiquan and had reportedly cross-trained with Motobu Chōki in the Okinawan village of Kume Mura several years previously. Later Trias reportedly studied with Hoy Yuan Ping in Singapore in 1944. In addition to these teachers, Trias learned from other martial art teachers, such as Yajui Yamada (judo), Gogen Yamaguchi (Gōjū-ryū), Roy Oshiro (Gōjū-ryū), Yasuhiro Konishi, Makoto Gima (Shotokan, Shitō-ryū), and many others. Both Konishi and Gima served as mentors to Trias instead of in a formal teacher-student relationship.

Konishi, a prominent student of Gichin Funakoshi, Choki Motobu, and Kenwa Mabuni, recognized and countersigned Trias's promotion certificate to 9th Dan by the USKA in the 1960s. Gima was a prominent student of Funakoshi and he recognized Trias as 10th Dan in 1983, reaffirming Trias as style head for Shuri-ryū.

Techniques 
In addition to the punches, blocks, and kicks of karate, Shuri-ryū also incorporates joint locks, take-downs and throws, and kobudō (traditional weapons). Several senior sensei also hold high ranks in jujitsu and judo.

Shuri Ryu follows a system of teachings called the Haryu which are identifiers of the system.

Shuri-ryū also has several short combinations. These include: 26 ippon (ippon kumite kata), which are performed to develop form and power; 10 taezu (taezu naru waza) which are performed to develop speed and fluidity; 30 kihon which are performed to develop fighting technique; eight sen-te motions; and seven kogeki-ho ho to develop attacking and retreating.

In addition, there are training exercises including form sparring (kata kumite), focus stance sparring (kime dachi kumite), free exercise (jiyū undō), and free sparring (jiyū kumite).

Kata 
Shuri-ryū has three form exercises called Taikyoku Ichi, Ni, and San to prepare the student to learn the 15 core forms (kata):
 
 Wansu
 Anaku
 Naihanchi Shō (Tekki Shodan)
 Empi Shō (Wanshu)
 Sanchin
 Tsue Shō
 Bassai Dai
 Gopei Shō
 Danenn Shō
 Naihanchi Ni (Tekki Nidan)
 Nandan shō (Nijūshiho / Niseishi)
 Kankū Shō (Kusanku Shō)
 Tekatana
 Naihanchi San (Tekki Sandan)
 Tensho

Besides these forms, there exist numerous variations of Sanchin and Tenshō. Also, the senior sensei of Shuri-ryū also teach several other forms such as Shudoso and another related art which teaches Hakutsuru Shodan, Nidan, Sandan, and Yondan.

Many of the above kata emphasize the use of various animal forms, and the definitions are often reflective of this. For example, Wunsu (Strong Arm Dumping Form or Dragon Boy Dumping Form) uses the tiger form, Anaku refers to a swallow pivoting on a beach, Empisho (First Elbow Form) refers to the flying swallow, and Gopei Sho refers to a tearing peacock. Some kata will emphasize multiple animal forms, such as Danenn Sho, where ten animals are emulated. Also, there are 15 animal body and 20 fist form exercises.

Ranks 
The Shuri-ryū style, like most systems of the martial arts, uses a belt system to designate rank. The appropriate rank is awarded when the student demonstrates a certain level of proficiency when performing the required techniques, kata, and exercises. The ranking system as spelled out in The Pinnacle of Karate by Trias called for 8 ranks below black belt (Kyu), and 10 above (Dan). Because of the time and difficulty of receiving Yellow belt, some schools award various informal ranks in the interim.

 White (8th Kyu - hachikyu, unless additional informal ranks are included)
 Interim Ranks (Informal ranks of Orange, Gold, "Black Dot", and/or various stripes are awarded at some schools) 
 Yellow (7th Kyu - shichikyu, student officially becomes a member of the Shuri-Ryu Style)
 Blue (6th Kyu - rokukyu)
 Green (5th Kyu - gokyu)
 Purple (4th Kyu yonkyu)
 Brown (3rd Kyu - sankyu, 2nd Kyu - nikyu, 1st Kyu ikkyu)
 Black (1st Dan - shodan through 10th Dan - judan)

At each rank, the student must also pass a rigorous physical requirement before performing the technical requirements. Running one or two miles (up to blue = 1 mile, purple and beyond = 2 miles), lifting 10 or 15 lb weights 75 times over the head (depending on gender), performing 500–1000 front kicks, and various hand technique exercises are commonly used.

Upon receiving the rank of Yellow Belt, the student officially becomes a member of the Shuri-Ryu Style. At this point, the student may wear a white & green patch showing the emblem of the system.  At the rank of Black Belt, the student may wear a black & green system patch. If awarded the position of Assistant Chief Instructor, a red circle (and sometimes a half-sun) is added. Once receiving the position of Chief Instructor, the full style emblem is worn, consisting of a red circle, red sun, black pine tree, on a green background.

Identifying features 
One characteristic feature of Shuri-ryū is the use of the Shuri fist, in lieu of a standard fist. Instead of curling the index finger when making the fist, the upper half of the index finger is laid flat against the palm, with the thumb curled around the index finger and pushing down between the first and second joints, resulting in a tighter fist and better alignment of the ulna and radius bones with the first two knuckles of the fist.

Another feature of Shuri-ryū is the position of the thumb of the knife hand strike or block. The thumb and forefinger form a "j" so that the hand may be used in a variety of techniques (ridgehand, spearhand, open-hand throat strikes, etc.) without changing the thumb position.

Chief instructors and senior sensei 
Prior to 1989, Trias had designated 8 Chief Instructors and 3 assistant Chief Instructors of the Shuri-ryū system to perpetuate Shuri-ryū after his death; Roberta Trias-Kelley, the late John Pachivas, Robert Bowles, the late Ridgely Abele, Pete Rabino, the late Michael Awad, Dale Benson, and the late Dirk Mosig,

Other individuals who were designated Chief Instructors at one time but left Trias are Victor Moore, Phillip Koeppel, James McLain, John Hutchcroft, and Randy Holman.  A former Assistant Chief Instructor appointed by Trias is Wendi Dragonfire but was removed from this position.

Traditionally, a karate system was owned by the family of the founder. Thus, upon Trias' death in 1989, his daughter, Roberta Trias-Kelley, inherited the Shuri-ryū system as style head. While Dirk Mosig followed her leadership, the majority of members did not.

In 1995 John Pachivas appointed Robert Bowles as style head of Shuri-ryū. Bowles founded the International Shuri-ryū Association (ISA) with the following Chief Instructors as Executive Directors: John Pachivas, Ridgely Abele, Pete Rabino, Michael Awad, and Dale Benson. Since then, the International Shuri-ryū Association, under Robert Bowles, has become the largest organization of Shuri-ryū stylists in the world, and has appointed additional Chief Instructors and Assistant Chief Instructors. Additionally prior to his death in 2000, John Pachivas passed on his American Shuri Karate lineage to Jerry Piddington.

A number of Shuri-ryu stylists can also be found in the United States Karate-Do Kai (USKK), an organization founded by former Chief Instructor and Trias' senior most student, Phillip Koeppel. Unlike the ISA, the USKK has not appointed new Chief Instructors. Instead, Koeppel appointed a Style Head which serves a similar function. The current USKK Style Head for Shuri-ryu is David Hamann, other senior instructors in this group include James McLain and Michael Awad. Former Chief Instructors Phillip Koeppel and John Hutchcroft are also USKK members, though they now practice Matsumura Seito Shorin-Ryu. Another USKK member and Trias student, Glenn R. Keeney also teaches Shuri-Ryu. Though not an organizational promotion, Michael Awad has personally awarded several members from this group to the position of Chief Instructor and Assistant Chief Instructor.

Currently, there appears to be four strains of Shuri-ryū each, respectively, centering on Roberta Trias-Kelley, Robert Bowles' ISA, Victor Moore's TWKA, and the USKK group under McLain/Awad/Hamann. Membership in the various organizations is not mutually exclusive, and many Shuri-ryu practitioners are active in multiple groups.

The instructors below are either spelled out to be Chief Instructors in "The Pinnacle of Karate" or affiliated with the ISA, USKK, and TWKA.

Trias Appointed Chief Instructors
 Roberta Trias-Kelley, 10th Dan, Arizona
 * Robert Bowles, 10th Dan, Indiana
 John Pachivas (deceased),10th Dan, Florida 
 Ridgely Abele (deceased), 9th Dan, South Carolina
 Pete Rabino, 9th Dan, California
 Dale Benson, 9th Dan, Arizona
 Michael Awad (deceased), 9th Dan, Ohio
 Dirk Mosig PhD (deceased), 8th Dan, Nebraska

Trias Appointed Assistant Chief Instructors
 Tony Bisanz, 8th Dan, Arizona
 Johnny Linebarger, 8th Dan, Arizona
 Joseph Walker, 9th Dan, Illinois/Texas

Trias Dojo Chief Staff Instructors
 Robert Bowles, 10th Dan, Indiana
 Pete Rabino, 9th Dan, California
 Michael Awad, 9th Dan, Ohio
 Milt Calander, 8th Dan, Arizona
 Dale Benson, 9th Dan, Arizona

ISA Chief Instructors
 Robert Bowles, 10th Dan, Indiana
 Dale Benson, 9th Dan, Arizona
 Joseph W. Walker, 9th Dan, Texas
 Sandra Bowles, 9th Dan, Michigan
 George Sheridan Jr., 9th Dan, Indiana
 Tony Bisanz, 8th Dan, Arizona
 Glenn Wallace, 7th Dan, Indiana
 Lon Bradfield, 7th Dan, Colorado
 Niels Larsen, 7th Dan, Denmark
 Luis Lugo, 7th Dan, Florida
 Gus Lugo, 7th Dan, Florida 
 Todd Sullivan, 6th Dan, Indiana
 Joseph Johnston, 6th Dan, Illinois
current as of 9/2017

ISA Assistant Chief Instructors
 Rick Scoppe, 7th Dan North Carolina
 John Venson, 9th Dan, Chicago, IL
 Donna Judge 8th dan Florida
 Amanda Kaufman 5th Dan, Ohio
 Reggie Venson 7th Dan, Illinois
 Jon Wong 5th Dan Florida
 Brenda Armentrout 7th Dan, Indiana
 Anna Gorman 5th Dan, New Mexico

International Shuri-ryū Association Council members
 Tony Bisanz, 8th Dan, Arizona
 Sandra Bowles, 8th Dan, Indiana
 Milt Calander, 8th Dan, Arizona
 John Linebarger, 7th Dan, Arizona
 Joseph W. Walker, 9th Dan, Texas
 Rodolfo Rodriguez, 7th Dan, Venezuela, Caracas

TWKA Chief Instructors
Victor Moore, 10th Dan, From Ohio lives in North Carolina
Woodrow Fairbanks, 10th Dan, Ohio
 John Jelks (deceased),10th Dan, Ohio
William Friend, 7th Dan, Kentucky
Thomas Boyajian Jr, 6th Dan, Ohio

USKK Style Heads
 James McLain (deceased), 9th Dan, Tennessee
 Michael Awad (deceased), 9th Dan, Ohio
 David Hamann, 8th Dan, Ohio (current)

Awad Appointed Chief Instructors
 David Hamann, 8th Dan, Ohio
 Richard Awad, 6th Dan, Ohio (R. Awad previously received a "Batsugan" or "Battlefield Promotion" to Asst. Chief Instructor from Trias)

Awad Appointed Assistant Chief Instructors
 Nathan England, 5th Dan, Ohio

External links 
 International Shuri-Ryu Association Homepage
 International Shuri-Ryu Association Facebook

References 

Japanese martial arts
North American martial arts
Karate in the United States